The Madreya are the sons of Madri featured in the Mahabharata. They are the youngest among the five Pandavas. The Madreya are born to Madri when she chants a mantra to invoke the Ashvin twins, though they are legally regarded to be the sons of Pandu.

The Madreya are:
 Nakula -  Nakula is the son of Madri and the Ashvin named Nasatya.
 Sahadeva - Sahadeva is the son of Madri and the Ashvin named Dasra.

References

External links 

 The Mahābhārata of Vyasa, translated from Sanskrit into English by Kisari Mohan Ganguli and published online at sacred-texts.com.

Characters in the Mahabharata
Characters in the Bhagavata Purana